Hercules and Love Affair is the debut studio album by American electronic music band Hercules and Love Affair, released on March 10, 2008 by DFA Records. The album was produced by Andrew Butler and Tim Goldsworthy. Andrew Raposo (of fellow DFA band Automato) and Tyler Pope (of !!!) contributed bass to the album, while Anohni co-wrote and performed vocals on select songs.

Music

Most reviewers comment on the album's musical style as an homage to or re-imagining of disco and classic house music. Fact Magazine dubbed the album's style "a pulsating, glamorous, elegiac mix of classic disco influences, live instrumentation and modernist, mind-spangling electronic production." Similarly, The Daily Telegraph critic Bernadette McNulty dubs the music "d-i-s-c-o in its seventies glory" into which "Butler weaves [...] fractured Chicago house beats and pulsing synths," going on to refer to the overall style of the album as "a tableau of beautiful, dysphoric disco visions." The Guardian also describes the music in the same terms, commenting "it sounds like proper late-70s disco. Not the camp glitterball retro electro-pop of Kylie circa 'Spinning Round', but actual underground disco, like something long-lost from the vaults of The Loft or the Paradise Garage, real 1977–78 vintage stuff." However, while most focus on the obvious musical debt to disco, some critics highlight the album's eclectic range of styles, such as Eddy Lawrence, for whom the album "has dark, psychedelic moments, such as the downbeat, mildly menacing, almost Congotronic 'Easy' alongside outright funky party stuff like 'You Belong'." Butler himself describes the album's musical approach thus:  I always say it's a rhythmic, artsy kind of pop music that was made with classic dance and electronic music in mind. It has a lot of vocals and is rooted in my childhood.

The album's first single "Blind", co-written and featuring vocals by Anohni, was released on March 3, 2008 and reached number forty on the UK Singles Chart. The NME called it a "stone-cold classic", going on to describe it as "the best kind of dance record: physical and emotional, euphorically happy and deeply, irredeemably sad. It clips along weightlessly; all disco bass, trumpets and rippling synthesiser, as Anohni, his voice like tears rolling down the cheeks of a beautiful 40-year-old woman, muses intoxicatingly on lost innocence and ageing." However, the magazine dismissed the song "You Belong" as "essentially just an old Chicago house tune given a digital spit'n'polish." The music video for "Blind" was directed by London-based Saam and features English actress Jamie Winstone walking through clouds of smoke. Pitchfork described the video as a "bacchanalian orgy tak[ing] place all around [Winstone], hearkening back to the pre-AIDS days of disco and places like the Continental Baths, where Larry Levan DJed and which advertisers promoted as recalling 'the glory of ancient Rome'."

Critical reception

Hercules and Love Affair received general acclaim from music critics. At Metacritic, which assigns a weighted average rating out of 100 to reviews from mainstream critics, the album received an average score of 86, based on 31 reviews, which indicates "universal acclaim". Fact magazine called it "a unique, deeply satisfying and insanely catchy piece of work." Dan Weiss of The Village Voice praised its "glorious funkscapes". Pitchforks Philip Sherburne awarded the album 9.1/10, and described it as "Lush, melancholic, gregarious, generous, both precise and a little bit unhinged" before going on to proclaim "this is the most original American dance album in a long while." Pitchfork named "Blind" the best song of 2008 and placed it at number eighteen on the website's list of The Top 500 Tracks of the 2000s, while the album itself was ranked number 132 on their list of the top 200 albums of the 2000s. Paul Flynn of The Observer awarded the album a maximum five stars, commenting that it "concentrates on the musicality of the [disco] genre and leaves the cliches for dust," adding "it is as sweaty, raw and meaningful as the first 12-inch singles that were spun at NY lofts."

The Guardian critic Alexis Petridis was slightly more skeptical, finding the album's first side to be "tremendous fun", but - as a result of its being confined to genre revivalism - to possess "an air of pointlessness". However, he deemed the inclusion of Hegarty's melancholic vocals in the disco setting to be "inspired," and praised the album's "far more inventive second half [,as] its atmosphere shifts from touchy-feely warmth to queasy unease to deep melancholy, as if the authors keep being jolted from their nostalgic musical reverie by the thought of how horribly it all ended."

The single "Blind" was included at number two on Entertainment Weeklys list of the 10 Best Singles of 2008.

Track listing

Personnel
Credits adapted from the liner notes of Hercules and Love Affair.

Hercules and Love Affair
 Andrew Butler – production ; keyboards ; marimba ; vocals 
 Anohni – vocals ; additional production ; additional vocals 
 Kim Ann Foxman – vocals 
 Nomi – vocals 
 Andrew Raposo – bass 
 Morgan Wiley – keyboards 
 Carter Yasutaki – trumpet 

Additional personnel

 Kevin Barker – guitar 
 Steven Berstein – trumpet 
 Eric Broucek – engineering, mixing ; rhythm guitar 
 Chris Castagno – additional engineering 
 Walter Fischbacher – additional engineering 
 Tim Goldsworthy – drum programming ; production 
 Ben Guttin – drawings

 Cory King – trombone 
 Nick Millhiser – drums 
 Maxim Moston – strings ; drum programming 
 Alex Nizich – additional engineering 
 Jason Nocito – photography
 Ben Perowsky – drums 
 Tyler Pope – bass 
 Scott Williams – art direction

Charts

Release history

References

2008 debut albums
DFA Records albums
Hercules and Love Affair albums
Mute Records albums
Parlophone albums